Punjabiyat means "Punjabiness" and is the language revitalization movement of Punjabi.

In Pakistan, its goal is a better status of Punjabi language along with Urdu at state level. In India, its goal is to bring together the Sikh, Hindu and Muslim communities.

The movement's supporters in the Punjabi diaspora focus on the promotion of a shared cultural heritage.

See also
Punjabi culture
Punjabi Culture Day
Punjabi festivals
Punjabi Wikipedia

References

Sources

Punjab
Punjab, Pakistan
Punjabi culture
Punjabi language
Punjabi nationalism